Glanz an der Weinstraße (Slovene: Klanc) is a former municipality in the district of Leibnitz in the Austrian state of Styria. Since the 2015 Styria municipal structural reform, it is part of the municipality Leutschach an der Weinstraße. Before World War One, it had a Slovene ethnic majority: according to the 1910 census, 56% of the population were Slovene speakers.

Population

References

Cities and towns in Leibnitz District